The Journal of Object Technology is an online scientific journal welcoming manuscripts describing theoretical, empirical, conceptual, and experimental results in the area of software and language engineering, including  

 programming paradigms
 software language engineering
 model-based and model-driven engineering
 requirement engineering
 software architecture
 software validation & verification
 software maintenance and evolution
 software analytics
 software development process and methodology

Each issue contains columns by regular columnists and peer-reviewed papers. Columnists include Dave Thomas, Won Kim, Bertrand Meyer and John McGregor. Its first issue appeared in May 2002, in response to the need for an international journal covering the object-oriented and component-based development field. From 1986 to 2001, the Journal of Object-Oriented Programming played much of that role, but after it was sold to a new owner in 2000, it was announced in the following year that it would cease publication at the end of the year. The launching of The Journal of Object Technology was largely a response to this event, as leaders from the community realized a flagship publication was needed. Since then the Journal evolved by broadening its audience.

Platinum Open Access 
The Journal of Object Technology is open-access and completely free to both readers and authors (“platinum” model). This model has been adopted since the journal’s visionary creation in 2002 and applies to all contributions (available under the Creative Commons license). If you are interested in the Journal's view on Open Access and in understanding what are the pros and cons of the different Open Access models you can have a look at the following editorial Open Access: all you wanted to know and never dared to ask.

Continuous Publication Scheme 
The Journal of Object Technology uses a continuous publication scheme whereby regular papers, upon acceptance, are immediately added into a dynamic annual issue, with final DOI and other metadata.

Indexing 
The journal has been indexed by DBLP, Google Scholar, Microsoft Academic Search, Scirus, ScientificCommons, Index of IS Journals, and Scopus. It is registered under ISSN 1660-1769.

Masthead

Editor-in-Chief 
 Alfonso Pierantonio, Università degli Studi dell'Aquila, Italy

Deputy Editor-in-Chief 
 Mark van den Brand, Technical University of Eindhoven, The Netherlands 
 Benoit Combemale, University of Rennes, France

Special Theme Editor 
 Richard Paige, McMaster University, Canada

Founder 
 Bertrand Meyer, ETH Zurich, Switzerland

Founding Editor Emeritus 
 Richard Wiener, University of Colorado at Colorado Springs, USA

Steering Committee 
 Bertrand Meyer, ETH Zurich, Switzerland
 Oscar Nierstrasz, University of Bern, Switzerland
 Richard Paige, McMaster University, Canada
 Antonio Vallecillo, University of Malaga, Spain
 Jan Vitek, Northeastern University, USA

Editorial Board 
 Antonia Bertolino, CNR ISTI, Italy
 Tony Clark, Aston University, Italy
 Juan de Lara, Universidad Autònoma de Madrid, Spain
 Davide Di Ruscio, Università degli Studi dell'Aquila, Italy
 Jürgen Dingel, Queen's University, Canada
 Stéphane Ducasse, INRIA, France
 Sebastien Erdweg, Johannes Gutenberg University Mainz, Germany
 Görel Hedin, Lund University, Sweden
 Zhenjian Hu, Peking University, China
 Jörg Kienzle, McGill University, Canada
 Jean-Marc Jézéquel, IRISA, France
 Doug Lea, State University of New York at Oswego, USA
 Gary Leavens, University of Central Florida, USA
 Kim Mens, Université Catholique de Louvain, Belgium
 James Noble, Victoria University of Wellington, New Zealand
 David Naumann, Stevens Institute of Technology, USA
 Houari Sahraoui, Université de Montréal, Canada
 Michael Stal, Rijksuniversiteit Groningen, The Netherlands
 Perdita Stevens, University of Edinburgh, UK
 Antonio Vallecillo, University of Malaga, Spain
 Daniel Varro, McGill University/BME, Canada/Hungary
 Eelco Visser, Delft University of Technology, The Netherlands 
 Jan Vitek, Northeastern University, USA
 Philip Wadler, University of Edinburgh, UK
 Manuel Wimmer, Johannes Kepler Universität Linz, Austria
 Elena Zucca, University of Genoa, Italy

References

External links
 

Computer science journals
Object-oriented programming
Software engineering publications
Open access journals
Bimonthly journals
English-language journals
Publications established in 2002